Rifka Angel (1899–1988) was a Russian-American artist, one of the first encaustic painters in the United States. Angel is known for her use of color and naïve style.

Life 
Born to Jewish parents in Kalvarija, Russian Empire (now Lithuania), Rifka Angel (née Angelovitch) came to the United States in 1914 to join her father, a recent immigrant. Angel's first husband, an art student, introduced her to John Sloan, Ernest Fiene, Emil Ganso, and Alfred Maurer. Ganso suggested that she try to paint watercolors. Angel showed some of her works to Sloan and the latter helped to exhibit her watercolors.

Rifka Angel studied briefly at the Art Students League of New York with Boardman Robinson and later in Vkhutemas (Moscow, USSR) with David Shterenberg. After her return to the United States, Angel married her second husband and moved to Chicago in 1929, where their daughter, Blossom Margaret, was born in 1930. The artist began to exhibit regularly: one-person shows in 1930 and 1931 at the Knoedler Gallery, Chicago and participation in numerous group shows in other locations. In 1934, her painting was selected to represent Chicago in the MoMA's "Painting and Sculpture from 16 American Cities" exhibition.

In the mid-late 1930s, Angel lived in New York; 1936-1939 she participated in the Federal Art Project. 1940-1946 the artist spent in Hawaii and the Midwest. Since 1946 and until her last days Angel lived and worked in New York.

References

Aber, Ita. "Rifka Angel." Woman's Art Journal 7, no. 2 (Fall 1986/Winter 1987): 32–35.
Frumess, Richard. "Rifka Angel, 1899–1988: An Encaustic Pioneer." Exh. cat. Kingston, NY: R & F Handmade Paints, 2005.

External links
Gail Stavitsky, Ph.D., Chief Curator, Montclair Art Museum, "Waxing Poetic: Encaustic Art in America during the Twentieth Century."
Susan Weininger, "Rifka Angel," Chicago Modern
"Rifka Angel," Illinois Women Artists Project, Bradley University
Rifka Angel, Collections, The Art Institute of Chicago
Rifka Angel: Ask Art profile

1899 births
1988 deaths
20th-century American painters
American women painters
Artists from Chicago
Painters from New York City
American people of Russian-Jewish descent
Emigrants from the Russian Empire to the United States
People from Kalvarija, Lithuania
20th-century American women artists
American people of Lithuanian-Jewish descent
Jewish American artists
Jewish women painters
Jewish painters
20th-century American Jews